Jaan Kriisa (31 December 1882 Ulila Parish, Tartu County – 8 August 1942 Sosva, Sverdlovsk Oblast, Russia) was an Estonian lawyer and politician. He was a member of I Riigikogu.

Kriisa was the Mayor of Tartu from 1917 until 1918 and again in 1919. From 1919 until 1920, he was Minister of Nutrition. Kriisa was arrested by the NKVD on 14 June 1941 and died in a prison camp.

References

1882 births
1942 deaths
20th-century Estonian lawyers
Members of the Riigikogu, 1920–1923
Mayors of Tartu
University of Tartu alumni
Estonian people who died in Soviet detention
People who died in the Gulag
People from Elva Parish